In the NUTS (Nomenclature of Territorial Units for Statistics) codes of Slovenia (SI), the three levels are:

NUTS codes
SI0 Slovenia
SI03	Eastern Slovenia (Vzhodna Slovenija)
SI031	Mura Statistical Region (Pomurska statistična regija)
SI032	Drava Statistical Region (Podravska statistična regija)
SI033	Carinthia Statistical Region (Koroška statistična regija)
SI034	Savinja Statistical Region (Savinjska statistična regija)
SI035	Central Sava Statistical Region (Zasavska statistična regija)
SI036	Lower Sava Statistical Region (Spodnjeposavska statistična regija)
SI037	Southeast Slovenia Statistical Region (Jugovzhodna Slovenija statistična regija)
SI038	Littoral–Inner Carniola Statistical Region (Primorsko-notranjska statistična regija)
SI04	Western Slovenia (Zahodna Slovenija)
SI041	Central Slovenia Statistical Region (Osrednjeslovenska statistična regija)
SI042	Upper Carniola Statistical Region (Gorenjska statistična regija)
SI043	Gorizia Statistical Region (Goriška statistična regija)
SI044	Coastal–Karst Statistical Region (Obalno-kraška statistična regija)

In the 2003 version, the codes were as follows:
SI0 Slovenia
SI00 Slovenia
SI001	Mura Statistical Region (Pomurska statistična regija)
SI002	Drava Statistical Region (Podravska statistična regija)
SI003	Carinthia Statistical Region (Koroška statistična regija)
SI004	Savinja Statistical Region (Savinjska statistična regija)
SI005	Central Sava Statistical Region (Zasavska statistična regija)
SI006	Lower Sava Statistical Region (Spodnjeposavska statistična regija)
SI009	Upper Carniola Statistical Region (Gorenjska statistična regija)
SI00A	Inner Carniola–Karst Statistical Region (Notranjsko-kraška statistična regija)
SI00B	Gorizia Statistical Region (Goriška statistična regija)
SI00C	Coastal–Karst Statistical Region (Obalno-kraška statistična regija)
SI00D	Southeast Slovenia Statistical Region (Jugovzhodna Slovenija statistična regija)
SI00E	Central Slovenia Statistical Region (Osrednjeslovenska statistična regija)

Local administrative units

Below the NUTS levels, the two LAU (Local Administrative Units) levels are:

The LAU codes of Slovenia can be downloaded here:

See also
 Subdivisions of Slovenia
 ISO 3166-2 codes of Slovenia
 FIPS region codes of Slovenia

Sources
 Hierarchical list of the Nomenclature of territorial units for statistics - NUTS and the Statistical regions of Europe
 Overview map of EU Countries - NUTS level 1
 SLOVENIJA - NUTS level 2
 SLOVENIJA - NUTS level 3
 Correspondence between the NUTS levels and the national administrative units
 List of current NUTS codes
 Download current NUTS codes (ODS format)
 Regions of Slovenia, Statoids.com
 Eurostat, Regions in the European Union, Nomenclature of territorial units for statistics NUTS 2013/EU-28, ISSN 2363-197X

Slovenia
Nuts